Eastern Mavericks is a NBL1 Central club based in Mount Barker, South Australia. The club fields both a men's and women's team. The club is a division of the overarching Eastern Mavericks District Basketball Club (EMDBC), the major administrative basketball organisation in the Adelaide Hills region. The Mavericks play their home games at St Francis de Sales Community Sports Centre.

Club history
The Eastern Mavericks District Basketball Club was established in 1995 following the amalgamation of the Murray Bridge Bullets and the Mt Lofty Spurs, both of whom were based in the Adelaide Hills and Murraylands region. The Mavericks entered men's and women's senior representative teams into the SA State League, which later became the central conference of the Continental Basketball Association (CBA).

The club's first and so far only championship came in 2004 when the men's team defeated the Woodville Warriors 93–80 in the Central ABL grand final.

Awards

Men

All Star Five
Jacob Holmes (2002, 2003, 2004)
Brad Hill (2006, 2009, 2010)

Frank Angove Medal
Jason Warhurst (1996)
Jacob Holmes (2002)
Brad Hill (2006)

Coach of the Year
Richard Hill (2005)

Woollacott Medal
Jacob Holmes (2003, 2004)

Women
All Star Five
Cayla George (2005, 2008)
Tess Madgen (2010, 2012, 2013)
Carmen Tyson-Thomas (2018, 2019)

Merv Harris Medal
Cayla George (2008)
Tess Madgen (2010)

Coach of the Year
Michael Williams (2005)

Halls Medal
Cayla George (2008)
Tess Madgen (2010)
Carmen Tyson-Thomas (2019)

 Most Valuable Player
Cayla George (2005, 2008)
Tess Madgen (2010, 2012, 2013)

References

External links
 EMDBC official website

Premier League (Australia) teams
Basketball teams established in 1995